Queen Beatrix International Airport ,, is an international airport located in Oranjestad, Aruba. It has flight services to the United States, several countries in the Caribbean, the northern coastal countries of South America, Canada, as well as some parts of Europe, notably the Netherlands. It is named after Beatrix of the Netherlands, who was Queen of the Netherlands from 1980 to 2013.

Overview
The airport offers United States border preclearance facilities. A terminal for private aircraft opened in 2007. The airport used to serve as the hub for bankrupt airline Air Aruba, which was for many years an international airline. Before Aruba's separation from the Netherlands Antilles in 1986 it was also one of three hubs for ALM Antillean Airlines as well as a home base for Tiara Air until 2016.

Since 2013 the airport is home to Aruba Airlines, a local airline. The airline has three Airbus A320 family aircraft and two Bombardier CRJ200. The main focus of Aruba Airlines is connecting the region through its hub.

History

In 1934, Manuel Viana launched a weekly mail and passenger service between Aruba and Curacao, with A.J. Viccellio piloting Loening C-2H Air Yacht PJ-ZAA from a mud-flat runway. Commercial services were taken over by KLM from 24 December 1934. Later they were transferred to a graded runway known as the KLM field.

During World War II, the airport was used by the United States Army Air Forces Sixth Air Force defending Caribbean shipping and the Panama Canal against German submarines. The airfield was renamed Dakota Field; the terminal facilities became Dakota Airport. Flying units assigned to the airfield were:

 59th Bombardment Squadron (9th Bombardment Group) 14 January-24 September 1942 (A-20 Havoc)
 12th Bombardment Squadron (25th Bombardment Group) 10 October 1942 – 23 November 1943 (B-18 Bolo)
 22d Fighter Squadron (36th Fighter Group) 2 September 1942 – April 1943 (P-40 Warhawk)
 32d Fighter Squadron (Antilles Air Command) 9 March 1943 – March 1944 (P-40 Warhawk)

On 22 October 1955, the airport was named after Princess Beatrix of the Netherlands during a royal visit. It was renamed in 1980 after her accession to the throne.

On 3 March 2021, American Airlines celebrated its 50 years flying to and from Aruba.

Airlines and destinations

Passenger

Notes
 KLM's flights operate to and from Bonaire on selected days.
 TUI fly Belgium's flights operate from Brussels to Aruba via Santo Domingo. However, the airline does not have cabotage rights to transport passengers solely between Aruba and Santo Domingo.
 TUI Airlines Netherlands's flights operate between Aruba, Bonaire and Curacao on selected days. However, the airline does not have fifth freedom rights to transport passengers solely between Aruba, Bonaire and Curacao.
 Winair's flights operate between Aruba and Sint Maarten via Curacao on selected days.

Cargo

Statistics

Accidents and incidents
On January 13, 2010, an Arkefly Boeing 767-300 (registration PH-AHQ), operating Flight 361 from Amsterdam Schiphol Airport to Queen Beatrix International Airport, declared an emergency after a man claimed to have a bomb on board. There ensued a struggle with the flight crew, and the aircraft made an emergency landing at Shannon Airport, Ireland. Gardaí stormed the plane and arrested the man; he was taken to Shannon Garda station. A passenger who had recently had surgery collapsed in the terminal while waiting for the continuation of the flight, and had to be taken to a local hospital. The replacement aircraft, PH-AHY, also a Boeing 767-300, continued the flight to Aruba.

See also
Trams in Oranjestad

References

Citations

Bibliography

External links

 Official Website
 
 

Airfields of the United States Army Air Forces
Airports in Aruba
Airports with United States border preclearance
Airports established in 1934
Oranjestad, Aruba
1934 establishments in Aruba
20th-century architecture in the Netherlands